Han Gyeong-im (born 19 September 1970) is a South Korean gymnast. She competed in six events at the 1988 Summer Olympics.

References

External links
 

1970 births
Living people
South Korean female artistic gymnasts
Olympic gymnasts of South Korea
Gymnasts at the 1988 Summer Olympics
Place of birth missing (living people)
Asian Games medalists in gymnastics
Gymnasts at the 1986 Asian Games
Asian Games silver medalists for South Korea
Asian Games bronze medalists for South Korea
Medalists at the 1986 Asian Games
20th-century South Korean women
21st-century South Korean women